A by-election was held in the Richmond (Yorks) constituency of the United Kingdom Parliament on 23 February 1989. It followed the resignation of the sitting Conservative Member of Parliament (MP) Leon Brittan on 31 December 1988, to allow him to take up the position of Vice-President of the European Commission.

The Conservative Party retained the seat, with future party leader William Hague the winner. The result was affected in part to the decision by the remnants of the Social Democratic Party (the part that objected to the merger with the Liberal Party the previous year) to contest the election  as well as the newly formed Social and Liberal Democrats (who subsequently renamed themselves the Liberal Democrats). The SDP candidate, local farmer Mike Potter, finished second (with 16,909 votes, 2,634 behind Hague), while the Social and Liberal Democrats' Barbara Pearce came third with 11,589.

The Labour Party achieved only fourth place in the election, at that time their worst position in any English by-election since World War II.

Hague retained the seat for the next 26 years, winning re-election at the 1992, 1997, 2001, 2005 and 2010 general elections.

Results 

Anthony Millns was an independent candidate who used his occupation "University Information Officer" on the ballot paper. His campaign was focused on keeping the brewery company Theakstons within British ownership.

See also
List of United Kingdom by-elections

References

Richmond (Yorks) by-election
Richmond (Yorks) by-election
Richmondshire
Richmond, North Yorkshire
By-elections to the Parliament of the United Kingdom in North Yorkshire constituencies
1980s in York
Richmond (Yorks) by-election